Bulungu is a town in Kasai-Central province of southern Democratic Republic of the Congo.

References

Populated places in Kasaï-Central